The Modest day gecko (Phelsuma modesta) is a species of gecko found in Madagascar.

Subspecies
Phelsuma modesta leiogaster 
Phelsuma modesta modesta

References

Phelsuma
Reptiles described in 1970